is a Japanese professional footballer who currently plays as a forward for Hong Kong Premier League club HKFC.

References

External links
 
 Yau Yee Football League profile

1983 births
Living people
Japanese footballers
Japanese expatriate footballers
Association football forwards
Hong Kong First Division League players
Hong Kong Premier League players
Hong Kong FC players
Japanese expatriate sportspeople in Hong Kong
Expatriate footballers in Hong Kong